The 2013–14 Pro Tour season was the nineteenth season of the Magic: The Gathering Pro Tour. It started on 25 May with Grand Prix Guadalajara and ended on 3 August 2014 with the conclusion of Pro Tour Magic 2015 in Portland. The season consisted of 57 Grand Prix and four Pro Tours, located in Dublin, Valencia, Atlanta, and Portland.

Grand Prix 

GP Guadalajara (25–26 May 2013)
Format: Standard
Attendance: 462
 Andrés Martínez
 Willy Edel
 Ken Yukuhiro
 Juan Carlos Castillo Mata
 Mervyn Cesar Gonzalez Delgado
 Emmanuel Ramírez Sánchez
 Manuel Monge Hernández
 Emiliano Sanchez Gonzalez

GP Providence (8–9 June 2013)
Format: Team Limited
Attendance: 1758 (586 teams)
1.
 Andrew Longo
 Eric Phillipps
 Eric Berger
2. 
 Matt McCullough
 Ari Lax
 Alexander John
3.
 Bruce Cowley
 Chris Manning
 Kevin Bohlmann
4.
 Martin Jůza
 Shuhei Nakamura
 Ben Stark

GP Gothenburg (8–9 June 2013)
Format: Limited
Attendance: 1006
 Oscar Christensen
 Mats Törnros
 Robin Steinborn
 Thoralf Severin
 Jan van der Vegt
 Mark Dictus
 Antti Varhimo
 Michal Gajewski

GP Houston (15–16 June 2013)
Format: Limited
Attendance: 999
 Shahar Shenhar
 Tom Ross
 Phu Dao
 Marc Lalague
 Mani Davoudi
 David Bruno
 Shuuhei Nakamura
 Darin Minard

GP Miami (29–30 June 2013)
Format: Standard
Attendance: 1258
 Reid Duke
 Josh McClain
 Brad Nelson
 Valentin Mackl
 Samuel Tharmaratnam
 Peter Ingram
 Christoffer Larsen
 Matthew Costa

GP Rimini (27–28 July 2013)
Format: Limited
Attendance: 1034
 Chistoph Aukenthaler
 Rasmus Björklund
 Emanuele Giusti
 Federico Del Basso
 Ben Stark
 Tamás Nagy
 Stjepan Sučić
 Pierre Sommen

GP Las Vegas (22–23 June 2013)
Format: Limited
Attendance: 4500
 Neal Oliver
 Madison Jonas
 Lance Hartbarger
 Dustin Ochoa
 Sean Collins
 Jeff Psyhos
 Steve Cahill
 Justin Nguyen

GP Kansas City (6–7 July 2013)
Format: Modern
Attendance: 958
 Seth Manfield
 Joe Hemmann
 Robert Berni
 Scott Hoppe
 Brandon Nelson
 Ari Lax
 Casey Swanson
 Greg Ogreenc 

GP Bangkok (22–23 June 2013)
Format: Limited
Attendance: 864
 Kurniadi Patraiwan
 Nicholas Wong
 Yu Chung Huang
 Yuuya Watanabe
 Boonyarit Triphonratana
 Chanaphol Kamolto
 Raymond Tan
 Beaumer Michael

GP Calgary (27–28 July 2013)
Format: Standard
Attendance: 630
 Alexander Hayne
 Stephane Gerard
 Brady Boychuk
 Ryan Zawalsky
 Jacob Wilson
 Adam Laforest
 Gavin Bennett
 Trent Douglas

Magic: The Gathering World Championship 
Amsterdam (31 July–4 August 2013)
 Prize pool: $108,000
 Format: Modern Masters Booster Draft, Standard, Magic 2014 Booster Draft, Modern
 Attendance: 16

Top 4 playoff

Final standings 

The following sixteen players received an invitation to the 2013 World Championship due to their performance in the 2012–13 season. They are ordered according to the final standings of the event.

World Magic Cup 
Amsterdam (2–4 August 2013)
 Prize pool: $250,000
 Format: Team Constructed, Team Limited

Top 8

Final standings

Grand Prix 

GP Warsaw (10–11 August 2013)
Format: Standard
Attendance: 984
 Wenzel Krautmann
 Felipe Tapia Becerra
 Jérémy Dezani
 Michal Kolacinski
 Niklas Ramquist
 Yann Robin
 Denniz Rachid
 Przemek Oberbek

GP Prague (31 August–1 September 2013)
Format: Limited
Attendance: 1508
 Anatoly Chuhwichov
 Marco Cammilluzzi
 Balazs Varady
 Kai Mokrusch
 Martin Jůza
 Amit Cohen
 Eliot Boussaudi
 Raphaël Lévy

GP Brisbane (5–6 October 2013)
Format: Modern
Attendance: 467
 Justin Robb
 Daniel Unwin
 Justin Cheung
 Ben Tudman
 Garry Wong
 Wilfy Horig
 Cameron Harris
 Wee Yuen Khor

GP Kitakyushu (24–25 August 2013)
Format: Standard
Attendance: 1184
 Raymond Tan
 Kouichi Kudou
 Kuo Tzu-Ching
 Ryosuke Nomura
 Kentaro Yamamoto
 Yuuta Takahashi
 Takashi Naitou
 Hiroaki Taniguchi
GP Detroit (14–15 September 2013)
Format: Modern
Attendance: 1461
 Josh McClain
 Reid Duke
 Ben Moir
 Ben Stark
 Adam Jansen
 Alex Majlaton
 Marcelino Freeman
 Willy Edel

GP Oakland (24–25 August 2013)
Format: Limited
Attendance: 1631
 William Jensen
 Neal Oliver
 Ben Lundquist
 Joshua Goldman
 Carlos Ale
 Travis Woo
 Elliott Woo
 Patrick Griffin

GP Oklahoma City (5–6 October 2013)
Format: Limited
Attendance: 1081
 Pierre-Christophe Mondon
 John Penick
 Ty Thomason
 Tyler Brandstetter
 William Lowry
 Zach Dorsett
 Rick Stout
 James Fulgium

Pro Tour Theros 

At the start of Pro Tour Theros Luis Scott-Vargas, William Jensen, and Ben Stark were inducted into the Hall of Fame. Day one ended with Samuel Black and Paul Rietzl having won all their eight matches. Thirteen players followed at seven wins, including well-known players such as Jon Finkel and Makihito Mihara. After round 15 of the tournament the standings shaped up in a way that guaranteed the best four player to qualify for the top eight, and allowed the players in fifth to eighth place to guarantee qualification for the top eight by drawing intentionally. Consequently, the eight players that were at the top of the standings after round 15 were also at the top after round 16, and thus qualified for the top eight. They were Jérémy Dezani, Guillaume Wafo-Tapa, and Pierre Dagen of France, Samuel Black and Paul Rietzl from the United States, Makihito Mihara and Kentarou Yamamoto from Japan, and Kamiel Cornelissen from the Netherlands. In the top eight the French players then only lost to each other. Wafo-Tapa was eliminated by Dagen in the quarter-finals, and in the finals Dezani defeated Dagen to win Pro Tour Theros.

Dublin (11–13 October 2013)
 Prize pool: $250,000
 Format: Standard, Booster Draft (Theros-Theros-Theros)
 Attendance: 428

Top 8

Final standings

Grand Prix 

GP Louisville (19–20 October 2013)
Format: Standard
Attendance: 1048
 Brian Braun-Duin
 Jon Stern
 Andrew Baeckstrom
 Alex Sittner
 Sam Black
 Brad Nelson
 Todd Anderson
 William Jensen

GP Santiago (2–3 November 2013)
Format: Standard
Attendance: 734
 Luis Navas
 Matias Soler
 Cristian Di Silvestre Vidal
 Nicolas De Nicola
 Luis Salvatto
 Carlos Davi Montenegro 
 Jonathan Melamed
 Vilmar Barbosa Destini

GP Albuquerque (22–23 November 2013)
Format: Standard
Attendance: 862
 Owen Turtenwald
 Sam Pardee
 Todd Anderson
 Valentin Mackl
 Samuel Black
 Joseph Nix
 Andrew Hanson
 Paul Rietzl

GP Hong Kong (19–20 October 2013)
Format: Limited
Attendance: 989
 Shuuhei Nakamura
 Martin Jůza
 Ken Yukuhiro
 Yuuta Takahashi
 Xiaoshi Lu
 Lei Yu Sheng
 Denny Dunsford
 Soon Lye Ng

GP Valencia (9–10 November 2013)
Format: Limited
Attendance: 1076
 Samuel Marti
 Andrii Gusiev
 Eddie Chalecki Cuenca
 Valentin Mackl
 Aleksejs Laizans
 Dmitriy Butakov
 Piero Lombardi
 Roberto Maestro

GP Kyoto (22–23 November 2013)
Format: Team Limited
Attendance: 1734 (578 teams)
1.
 Mike Hron
 Alexander Hayne
 Richard Hoaen
2. 
 Makihito Mihara
 Jun'ichirou Bandou
 Kentarou Yamamoto
3.
 Toshinori Shigehara
 Takayuki Kadono
 Hiroki Furukawa
4.
 Shouta Yasooka
 Tomoharu Saitou
 Katsuhiro Mori

GP Antwerp (26–27 October 2013)
Format: Modern
Attendance: 1601
 Patrick Dickmann
 Fabrizio Anteri
 Nazar Sotiriadi
 Rasmus Björklund
 Daniel Fior
 Thomas Hendriks
 Hermann Rúnarsson
 Alexandre Bonneau

GP Washington, D.C. (16–17 November 2013)
Format: Legacy
Attendance: 1698
 Owen Turtenwald
 Jared Boettcher
 Drew Tunison
 Samuel Black
 Craig Wescoe
 Andrew Cuneo
 Ted McCluskie
 Deshaun Baylock

GP Toronto (30 November–1 December 2013)
Format: Limited
Attendance: 1603
 Ari Lax
 Greg Ogreenc
 William Jensen
 Richard Kraupa
 Seth Manfield
 Ben Moir
 Robert Smith
 Edgar Magalhaes  

GP Vienna (30 November–1 December 2013)
Format: Standard
Attendance: 1465
 Marcin Staciwa 
 Robin Dolar 
 Niklas Kaltenböck
 Jérémy Dezani
 Stanislav Cifka
 Manuel Cecilia 
 Johan Prinzell 
 Oliver Polak-Rottmann

GP Prague (11–12 January 2014)
Format: Modern
Attendance: 1401
 Vjeran Horvat
 Marcel Kachapow
 Carlos Moral
 Emanuele Giusti
 Bernhard Wurmitzer
 Andrej Rutar
 Jérémy Dezani
 Robin Dolar

GP Kuala Lumpur (25–26 January 2014)
Format: Limited
Attendance: 1007
 Fabien Li
 Ryan Young Hao-Wei
 Park Jun Young
 Shamsul Bahrin Zainuddin
 Krissapas Kuptimitr
 Shouta Yasooka
 Jack Teo
 Mohd Khairul Anuar Abdul Aziz

GP Dallas  (7–8 December 2013)
Format: Standard
Attendance: 834
 Marlon Gutierrez
 William Jensen
 Carlos Reyes
 Ben Stark
 Haibing Hu
 Eric Centauri
 Seth Manfield
 Darin Minard

GP Sacramento (18–19 January 2014)
Format: Limited
Attendance: 1859
 Tom Martell
 Philip Yam
 Eric Pei
 Aaron Lewis
 Adam Mancuso
 Nathannael Maliszewski
 Ryan Miller
 Andy Voellmer

GP Paris (15–16 February 2014)
Format: Legacy
Attendance: 1587
 Javier Dominguez
 Maxime Gilles
 Loïc Le Briand
 Philipp Schönegger
 Jean-Mary Accart
 Jóse Manuel Fernández Castelló
 Stefan Böttcher
 Paulo Vitor Damo da Rosa

GP Shizuoka (21–22 December 2013)
Format: Standard
Attendance: 1784
 Ryo Nakada
 Shota Takao
 Hajime Nakashima
 Shouta Yasooka
 Kazuaki Fujimura
 Keisuke Sato
 Tadaki Tsukagoshi
 Junya Iyanaga

GP Vancouver (25–26 January 2014)
Format: Standard
Attendance: 1042
 Alexander Hayne
 Peter Sundholm
 Robert Gillespie
 Jon Stern
 Matthew Sperling
 Adam Ruprecht
 Eugene Hwang
 Mike Vasovski
GP Mexico City (15–16 February 2014)
Format: Limited
Attendance: 704
 Marc Lalague
 Marcelino Freeman
 Hugo Daniel Araiza
 Ignaci Ibarra Del Rio
 Mario Flores
 Emiliano Sanchez
 Miguel Rodriguez
 Derek Woloshyn

Pro Tour Born of the Gods 

Valencia (21–23 February 2014)
 Prize pool: $250,000
 Format: Modern, Booster Draft (Born of the Gods-Theros-Theros)
 Attendance: 393

Top 8

Final standings

Grand Prix 

GP Barcelona (1–2 March 2014)
Format: Team Limited
Attendance: 1626 (542 teams)
1.
 Christian Seibold
 Tobias Gräfensteiner
 Daniel Gräfensteiner

2.
 Olivier Duport
 Wilson Lam
 Louis Ballivet

3. 
 Owen Turtenwald
 William Jensen
 Reid Duke

4.
 Manuel Hauck
 Stephan Schwarz
 Christian Hauck

GP Melbourne (1–2 March 2014)
Format: Standard
Attendance: 902
 Nam Sung-Wook
 Patty Robertson
 Yifan Wei
 Ash Webster
 Joe Zheng Jingwei
 Luke McGlaughlin
 Craig Chapman
 Huang Hao-Shan

GP Richmond (8–9 March 2014)
Format: Modern
Attendance: 4300
 Brian Liu
 Vipin Chackonal
 Mike Sigrist
 Oscar Jones
 Ben Friedman
 Jamie Parke
 Josh McClain
 Luis Scott-Vargas

GP Montreal (15–16 March 2014)
Format: Limited
Attendance: 1614
 Gerard Fabiano
 Dave Shiels
 Daniel Fournier
 Ian Robertson
 Judah Alt
 Brock Parker
 Morgan Chang
 Benjamin Gomes

GP Vienna (22–23 March 2014)
Format: Limited
Attendance: 1208
 Aniol Alcaraz
 Jérémy Dezani
 Robert Jurkovic
 Aleksa Telarov
 Andreas Lesch 
 Mads Utzon 
 Alexey Antonenko
 Denniz Rachid

GP Philadelphia (12–13 April 2014)
Format: Limited
Attendance: 1892
 Frank Skarren
 Reid Duke
 Adam Mancuso
 Mark Evaldi
 Christian Calcano
 William Jensen
 Danny Goldstein
 Pierre-Chris Mondon

GP Warsaw (10–11 May 2014)
Format: Limited
Attendance: 1004
 Fabrizio Anteri
 Javier Dominguez
 Ben Yu
 Bernhard Lehner
 Sergiy Sushalskyy
 Ivan Floch
 Nicolas Vanderhallen
 Daniel Fior

GP Buenos Aires (15–16 March 2014)
Format: Standard
Attendance: 884
 Philippe Monlevade
 Demian Tejo
 Paulo Vitor Damo da Rosa
 José Echeverría
 Fernando Pietragallo
 Mateus Dos Anjos
 Eduardo Castro
 Sebastian Martinez

GP Beijing (29–30 March 2014)
Format: Standard
Attendance: 1224
 Yuuya Watanabe
 Sherwin Pu 
 Ben Ge
 Ken Sawada
 Shuhei Nakamura
 Jian Zhong
 Nam Sung-Wook
 Naoki Shimizu

GP Nagoya (12–13 April 2014)
Format: Limited
Attendance: 1786
 Ryousuke Kasuga
 Takashi Boku
 Hisataka Matsui
 Takatoshi Satou
 Ryuuji Itagaki
 Hiroshi Date 
 Chapman Sim 
 Yuuya Sugiyama

GP Cincinnati (22–23 March 2014)
Format: Standard
Attendance: 1735
 Kyle Boggemes
 Brad Nelson
 Jared Boettcher
 Clyde Martin
 Jeffrey Pyka
 Bradford Grant
 Auston Tramper
 Jacob Maynard

GP Phoenix (5–6 April 2014)
Format: Standard
Attendance: 1463
 Robert Berni
 Nathan Holiday
 Gary Wong
 William Levin
 Art Macurda
 Eric Froehlich
 Brandon Bercovich
 Daniel Ward

GP Minneapolis (10–11 May 2014)
Format: Modern
Attendance: 1690
 Park Jun Young
 Andrew Huska
 Shaun McLaren
 Gregory Orange
 Nathan Holiday
 Nick Bonham
 Taylor Laehn
 Brian Braun-Duin

Pro Tour Journey into Nyx 

Atlanta (16–18 May 2014)
 Prize pool: $250,000
 Format: Block Constructed, Booster Draft (Journey into Nyx-Born of the Gods-Theros)
 Attendance: 349

Top 8

Final standings

Grand Prix 

GP Atlanta (24–25 May 2014)
Format: Limited
Attendance: 1299
 Jon Stern
 Tomoharu Saito
 William Jensen
 Charley Murdock
 Alex Majlaton
 Shaun McLaren
 Chris Fennell
 Vidianto Wijaya

GP Manchester (31 May–1 June 2014)
Format: Block Constructed
Attendance: 1406
 Fabrizio Anteri
 Tamás Glied
 Sebastian Knörr
 Valentin Mackl
 Bradley Barclay
 Nikolas Labahn
 Marcio Carvalho
 Juan Carlos Adebo Díaz

GP São Paulo (31 May–1 June 2014)
Format: Team Limited
Attendance: 945 (315 teams)
1.
 Carlos Alexandre Dos Santos Esteves
 Guilherme Medeiros Merjam
 Tulio Jaudy

2.
 Marcos Paulo Santiago Brandt
 Eduardo dos Santos Vieira
 Cezar H. Choji

3.
 Walter Perez
 Paulo Ricardo Cortez
 Lucas Esper Berthoud

4.
 Ian Thomas Farnung
 Stephen Berrios
 Armando Bulnes

GP Moscow (14–15 June 2014)
Format: Standard
Attendance: 532
 Igor Gorbunov
 Sergey Zheleznov
 Alexey Rogov
 Sergiy Sushalskyy
 Dmitriy Butakov
 Lee Shi Tian
 Efim Kashapov
 Keraan Chetty

GP Milan (28–29 June 2014) 
Format: Limited
Attendance: 1146
 Jérémy Dezani
 Nico Bohny
 Marcio Carvalho
 Ivan Floch
 Serafin Wellinger
 Evgeny Pestov
 Guido Citino
 Timothée Simonot

GP Chicago (21–22 June 2014)
Format: Standard
Attendance: 2041
 Tyler Blum
 Jadine Klomparens
 Adrian Sullivan
 Yuuta Takahashi
 Jared Boettcher
 Oscar Jones
 Steve Wise
 Steve Rubin

GP Boston (26–27 July 2014)
Format: Modern
Attendance: 1461
 Robin Dolar
 Andrew Boswell
 Philip Napoli
 Alex Bertoncini
 Nathan Jones
 Wesley Hovanec
 Pierre Dagen
 Marc Tobiasch

GP Washington, D.C. (28–29 June 2014)
Format: Limited
Attendance: 1422
 Mike Sigrist
 Yuuya Watanabe
 Wing Chun Yam
 Alexander John
 William Jensen
 Christian Calcano
 Charles League
 David Fulk

GP Taipei (26–27 July 2014)
Format: Limited
Attendance: 982
 Huang Hao-Shan 
 Ciang Lyu Li 
 Ryan Luo
 Cheng Tung Yi
 Kazuyuki Takimura
 Joe Soh
 Chung Ngai Shair
 Steven Setya

Pro Tour Magic 2015 

Portland (1–3 August 2014)
 Prize pool: $250,000
 Format: Standard, Booster Draft
 Attendance: 358

Top 8

Final standings

Pro Player of the Year final standings 
The 2013–14 Pro Tour season ended after Pro Tour Magic 2015. These are the final standings of the Player of the Year race, including every player who at the end of the season reached Platinum, the highest Pro Club Level.

Invitees to the 2014 World Championship 

The following twenty-four players received an invitation to the 2014 World Championship due to their performance in the 2013–14 season.

* = Originally, Jared Boettcher had been declared Rookie of the Year, but when he was suspended by the DCI for cheating, his rookie title was also revoked and passed down to Raymond Perez Jr.

References 

Magic: The Gathering professional events